{{Speciesbox
| image = Pinus_devoniana_02.jpg
| image_caption = 
| status = LC
| status_system = IUCN3.1
| status_ref = 
| genus = Pinus
| parent = Pinus subsect. Ponderosae
| display_parents = 3
| species = devoniana
| authority = Lindl. (Lindley 1839)
| range_map =  Pinus devoniana range map 1.png
| range_map_caption = Natural range of Pinus devoniana
| synonyms = 
Pinus filifolia Lindley 1839Pinus macrophylla Lindley, 1839Pinus michoacana Roezl, 1857
}}Pinus devoniana is a species of conifer in the family Pinaceae. These species are sometimes difficult to distinguish, while hybrids probably occur. The cones are especially variable. Overall, both foliage and cones are larger in Pinus devoniana.

References

Literature and sources
 Dallimore, W. and Bruce Jackson – A handbook of Coniferae. Edward Arnold Publishers, London 1923, 2nd ed. 1931, 3rd ed. 1948, reprinted 1954
 Farjon, Aljos – Pines; drawings and descriptions of the genus Pinus''. Brill/Backhuys, Leiden 1984
 Farjon, Aljos, Jorge A. Perez de la Rosa & Brian T. Styles (ill. Rosemary Wise) – A field guide to the Pines of Mexico and Central America. Royal Botanic Gardens, Kew, in association with the Oxford Forestry Institute, Oxford 1997
 Farjon, Aljos and Brian T. Styles – Pinus (Pinaceae); monograph 75 of Flora Neotropica. New York Botanical Gardens, New York 1997
 Farjon, Aljos – World checklist and bibliography of Conifers. Second edition. Royal Botanic Gardens, Kew 2001
 Kent, Adolphus H. – Veitch's Manual of the Coniferae. James Veitch & Sons, Chelsea 1900.
 Lanyon, Joyce W. - A card key to Pinus based on needle anatomy. Min. for Conservation, Sydney, New South Wales, Australia 1966

Trees of Mexico
Trees of temperate climates
devoniana
Least concern plants
Trees of Guatemala
Taxonomy articles created by Polbot
Flora of the Sierra Madre Occidental